"The Bald" is an epithet for the following:

People
Ælfheah the Bald (died 951), Bishop of Winchester
Baldwin II, Margrave of Flanders (c. 865–918), nicknamed  (the Bald)
Bolesław II the Horned (c. 1220/5–1278), Duke of Kraków (1241), Southern Greater Poland (1241–1247), Silesia-Wroclaw (1241–1248), and Środa Śląska (from 1277)
Charles the Bald (823-877), Holy Roman Emperor and King of West Francia
Constantine III of Scotland (before 971–997), King of Scots, called  (the Bald)
Hasdrubal the Bald, a Carthaginian general in the Second Punic War
Idwal Foel (died c. 942), King of Gwynedd in Wales
Ladislas the Bald (before 997–before 1030), a member of the House of Árpád and a grandson of Taksony, Grand Prince of the Hungarians
Owain Foel (fl. 1018), King of the Cumbrians, also known as Eugenius Calvus
Prokop the Great (1380–1434), a general of the Hussite movement
Rodrigo Fernández de Castro, (died after 1144), a Castilian nobleman and soldier called  (the Bald)

Mythological figures
Conán mac Morna, also known as Conán Maol ("the Bald"), a member of the fianna in the Fenian Cycle of Irish mythology

See also
Baldy (nickname)
List of people known as the Hairy

Lists of people by epithet